Munkegata was a tram stop on the Gamleby Line of the Oslo Tramway. It is located at the intersection of Oslo gate and Schweigaards gate in Gamlebyen, Oslo, Norway.

The station opened on 6 October 1875 as part of the Gamleby Line extension to Oslo Hospital by  Kristiania Sporveisselskab. The station was served by lines 18 and 19, which used both SL79 and SL95 trams. It was closed in late 2020, when the Gamleby Line was shifted to run through Bjørvika.

References

Oslo Tramway stations in Oslo
Railway stations opened in 1878

Disused Oslo Tramway stations